Taijo Teniste (born 31 January 1988) is an Estonian professional footballer who plays as a right back for Estonian Meistriliiga club Tartu Tammeka and the Estonia national team.

Club career

SK 10
Teniste came through the Spordiklubi 10 youth academy and played for the club's first team in the IV liiga.

Levadia
In January 2005, Teniste signed for Levadia. He made his debut in the Meistriliiga on 3 April 2005, in a 4–0 home victory over Merkuur Tartu. Teniste helped Levadia win four successive Meistriliiga titles in 2006, 2007, 2008 and 2009.

On 4 July 2011, Teniste joined League Two side Swindon Town for a trial, but was not offered a contract as manager Paolo Di Canio felt Teniste was not a natural left back.

Sogndal
On 1 September 2011, Teniste joined Norwegian club Sogndal on loan until the end of the season, with the option to make the deal permanent. He made his debut in the Tippeligaen on 11 September, in a 0–0 home draw against Aalesund, coming on as a substitute for Ole Jørgen Halvorsen in injury time. On 23 December 2011, Teniste signed a two-year contract with Sogndal. His contract was subsequently extended to 2015 and then to 2017. Teniste scored his first goal for Sogndal on 26 November 2017, in a 5–2 home win over Vålerenga in the last match of the 2017 season.

Brann
On 14 August 2017, it was announced that Teniste would join Brann after the 2017 season on a three-year deal.

International career

Teniste has represented Estonia at under-17, under-18, under-19, under-21 and under-23 levels.

Teniste made his senior international debut for Estonia on 9 November 2007, replacing Urmas Rooba in the 70th minute of a 0–2 away loss to Saudi Arabia in a friendly.
Teniste finally scored his first goal for the national team on his 93rd cap on 26 September 2022 scoring in a 0-4 UEFA Nations League away win against San Marino. This goal also helped Estonia seal their return to the C League.

Career statistics

Club

International

International goals

Honours

Club
Levadia II
Esiliiga: 2006, 2007

Levadia
Meistriliiga: 2006, 2007, 2008,  2009
Estonian Cup: 2006–07, 2009–10
Estonian Supercup: 2010

Sogndal
OBOS-ligaen: 2015

References

External links

1988 births
Living people
Sportspeople from Tartu
Estonian footballers
Association football defenders
Esiliiga players
FCI Levadia U21 players
Meistriliiga players
FCI Levadia Tallinn players
Eliteserien players
Norwegian First Division players
Sogndal Fotball players
SK Brann players
Estonia youth international footballers
Estonia under-21 international footballers
Estonia international footballers
Estonian expatriate footballers
Expatriate footballers in Norway
Estonian expatriate sportspeople in Norway
Tartu JK Tammeka players